The German torpedo boat TA24 was an  operated by the German Kriegsmarine during the Second World War. The ship was built for the Italian Navy by the shipbuilder Ansaldo at their Genoa shipyard with the name Arturo in 1943, but was incomplete when Italy surrendered to the Allies in September 1943, and was seized by Nazi Germany. The ship entered service as TA24 in October 1943, serving in the Tyrrhenian Sea and was sunk by British destroyers on 18 March 1945.

Design and construction
The Ariete class was an enlarged derivative of the Italian , intended to defend convoys from Italy to North Africa from attacks by British submarines and surface ships. To give the ships a chance of fighting British cruisers and destroyers, the Arietes had a heavier torpedo armament, sacrificing a  gun and some speed to accommodate this. A total of 42 ships were planned, but only 16 had been laid down by the time of Italy's surrender.

Displacement was  standard and  full load.

Main gun armament was two Oto Melera 100 mm/47 dual-purpose guns, while the planned close-in anti-aircraft battery consisted of two Breda 37 mm cannon and ten 20 mm cannon. Torpedo armament was to be two triple mounts for 450 mm (17.7 in) torpedo tubes. 28 mines could be carried. Owing to supply problems, however, the Arietes did not complete with the intended torpedo and anti-aircraft armament.  TA24 completed with the class's designed torpedo armament of six 450 mm torpedo tubes and with an anti-aircraft outfit of twelve 20 mm cannon. The ship had a crew in German service of 94 officers and enlisted.

Arturo was laid down at Ansaldo's Genoa shipyard on 15 July 1942 and was launched on 27 March 1943.  On 8 September 1943, an Armistice between Italy and the Allies was announced, and in response, German forces carried out pre-planned operations to disarm Italian forces, which resulted in ships under construction, like Arturo, being seized and completed by the Germans. Arturo was completed by the Germans as TA24 on 4 October 1943.

Service
TA24, like the other Italian torpedo boats on the West coast of Italy, joined the 10th Torpedo Boat Flotilla of the Kriegsmarine based at Genoa, where the flotilla was employed on escort and minelaying duties. On 22–23 December 1943, TA24, the torpedo boat TA23 (formerly the Italian Impavido) and the minelayer Niedersachsen laid a minefield off the north coast of Corsica.

In February 1944, the torpedo boats of the 10th Torpedo Boat Flotilla carried out four minelaying operations, and a series of bombardment operations (Operation Nussknacker) against Bastia, Corsica, with TA24 taking part on five nights, including on 1 March. In May 1944, the 10th Flotilla carried out four minelaying and two reconnaissance sorties, with a further four minelaying operations in June. On the night of 17/18 June 1944, TA24 and  clashed with five British and American motor torpedo boats. TA24 continued to be heavily employed on minelaying and reconnaissance operations during July 1944, clashing several times with Allied coastal forces.

On the night of 1/2 October 1944, TA24, TA29 and TA32 (the former Yugoslav destroyer Dubrovnik) were on the way to lay mines off Sanremo when they encountered the American destroyer  on patrol. Gleaves engaged the German ships, causing the minelaying mission to be aborted, but TA29 collided with TA24 as the Germans reversed their course, although the two ships managed to separate themselves and the three torpedo boats made for Genoa at maximum speed. The commander of Gleaves believed his ship had sunk two of the German ships, which he thought were merchant ships, while the commander of TA24 thought that their attacker, which he believed to be a French cruiser, was hit by TA24s fire. In fact none of the ships was hit by hostile fire, with TA24 and TA29 receiving minor damage from their collision.

On the night of 17/18 March 1945, TA24, TA29 and TA32, the last three remaining operational ships of the 10th Torpedo Boat Flotilla, carried out a minelaying operation off Corsica, and on the return journey were spotted by Allied shore-based radar at Livorno. Lookout engaged first, hitting both TA24 and TA29, immobilising TA29. Lookout concentrated on finishing off TA29, which was eventually sunk after being hit more than 40 times by Lookout. Meteor was left to deal with the other two ships, and sank TA24 with shellfire and torpedoes. TA32, although damaged, managed to escape. About 30 of TA24s crew were killed, with the remainder rescued by Meteor.

Notes

References

Publications

External links
 Classe Ariete Marina Militare website

Ariete-class torpedo boats
World War II torpedo boats of Italy
World War II torpedo boats of Germany
1943 ships
Ships built in Genoa
Maritime incidents in March 1945